Rosalia (Zale) Parry is an American pioneer scuba diver, underwater photographer and actress.

Diving
Parry started diving in the 1940s as a young girl. Born in Milwaukee, Wisconsin in 1933, she was raised on a Wisconsin lake and learned to swim and love the water at an early age. As a young woman, while working in Santa Monica, California, for the Douglas Aircraft Company, she became involved in pioneering diving and scientific work Sports Illustrated magazine. In 1953 she became a tester of underwater equipment for Scientific Underwater Research Enterprises. Later, she and her partner, (Parry Bivens, an aeronautical and aquatic engineer) designed, built, and marketed the first civilian hyperbaric chamber for divers. They were evangelists for the purchase of hyperbaric chambers around the world to provide lifesaving facilities for divers suffering from "the bends".

In 1954, Parry set a women's depth record to 209 feet. She is said to have stopped at 209 feet when she reached the bottom.  That year, she became the third female instructor to graduate from the L.A. County UICC program.

Acting
Later in 1954, Parry made her screen debut in Kingdom of the Sea, a Jack Douglas Production.  Because of her work in Kingdom of the Sea, Parry was tapped by the producers of the new show, Sea Hunt.  Parry has referred to Sea Hunt as an  "underwater western". The lead character, Mike Nelson (played by Lloyd Bridges), was introduced to an undersea problem or villain at the start of the show. By the end of the half-hour show, he had resolved the problem. Parry's beauty and her knowledge of the sea and diving made her a natural to join the Sea Hunt show. She was cast without a single screen test. Her role in the series was primarily as a female underwater stunt double, but she made appearances as an actress in a few episodes. She also assisted in teaching Mr. Bridges how to use scuba gear prior to the series going into production.

Parry's acting continued on other shows, including GE Theatre, Wagon Train, Peter Gunn, The Magic Circus, and others. Parry continued as an actor for a number of years including many commercials and as a stunt woman on a wide variety of shows involving underwater scenes.

In 2006 she was in the film Tillamook Treasure, in which she played Sam, the owner of a hardware store.

Other
Parry's experience goes beyond diving and acting. She is an accomplished photographer and writer. She has used her organizational skills to bring the beauty of underwater photography to the public.  In 1957, Parry co-founded the International Underwater Film Festival that ran for 17 years. In 1960, she became the first elected woman president of the U/W Photographic Society.

She wrote and published a book with the late Albert Tillman, Scuba America Vol. I, the Human History of Sport Diving in America. The book is now also available as an eBook.

She was on the cover of the May 23, 1955 issue of Sports Illustrated magazine.

Parry received the NOGI Award for Distinguished Service, DEMAs Reaching Out Award, the Women's Scuba Association Scuba Diver of the Year Award, and the Los Angeles Parks and Recreation Education Award. In 2001, Parry was made a "Lifetime Ambassador at Large", by The Academy of Underwater Arts and Sciences. In 2002, she was inducted into the Cayman Island International Scuba Diving Hall of Fame and received the Beneath the Sea Diver of the Year Award. In 2016 Parry was awarded the California Scuba Service Award for her enormous contribution to the California diving scene, and has been an ardent supporter of The Women Divers Hall of Fame (WDHOF) since its inception in 1999.

References

External links

Sea Hunt Trivia Guide, Zale Parry from The Scuba Guy

1933 births
Living people
Actresses from Wisconsin
Actresses from Oregon
American underwater divers
Underwater photographers
21st-century American women
American women photographers